The men's freestyle featherweight competition at the 1936 Summer Olympics in Berlin took place from 2 August to 4 August at the Deutschlandhalle. Nations were limited to one competitor. This weight class was limited to wrestlers weighing up to 61kg.

This freestyle wrestling competition continued to use the "bad points" elimination system introduced at the 1928 Summer Olympics for Greco-Roman and at the 1932 Summer Olympics for freestyle wrestling, with a slight modification. Each round featured all wrestlers pairing off and wrestling one bout (with one wrestler having a bye if there were an odd number). The loser received 3 points if the loss was by fall or unanimous decision and 2 points if the decision was 2-1 (this was the modification from prior years, where all losses were 3 points). The winner received 1 point if the win was by decision and 0 points if the win was by fall. At the end of each round, any wrestler with at least 5 points was eliminated.

Schedule

Results

Round 1

The four wrestlers who won by fall and the one with the bye took the lead, with 0 bad points. The three other winners by decision each received 1 point. All of the losers were defeated by either fall or unanimous decision, so each received 3 points.

 Bouts

	

 Points

Round 2

Three men maintained 0-point scores through the first two rounds, with three more scoring 1 point total. The five wrestlers who lost in both the first two rounds were eliminated. No wrestlers finished the round with 2 or 3 points; four finished with 4 points.

 Bouts

	

 Points

Round 3

Three losers and one winner were eliminated this round; Gavelli was out with a 5th point after winning by decision. Pihlajamäki was the only wrestler to maintain a 0-point score through the third round, though three men had only 1 point apiece.

 Bouts

	

 Points

Round 4

Of the three losers, Tóth and Mizutani were eliminated. Pettigrew had started with 1 point, so remained in contention with 4 after losing. Pihlajamäki won by fall again, keeping his 0 point run intact. Millard had 1 point, Frändfors had 2.

 Bouts

	

 Points

Round 5

The first bout pitted Frändfors against Pettigrew; each was threatened with elimination with a loss (though Frändfors would remain if he lost by split decision). Frändfors came out the victor by decision, eliminating Pettigrew. The second bout featured Pihlajamäki and Millard, neither of whom could be eliminated in the round. Millard's loss by unanimous decision took him from 1 point to 4 points, while Pihlajamäki received his first point. This left three men to contest the medals.

 Bouts

	

 Points

Round 6

Frändfors had not faced with of the two other remaining wrestlers, but Millard and Pihlajamäki had faced each other. Pihlajamäki had the bye in round 6. If Frändfors had won this round, he would have faced Pihlajamäki in a final round. However, Millard proved the better by split decision, giving both wrestlers 5 points and ending the competition with Pihlajamäki the only man left to take gold. The tie between Millard and Frändfors at 5 points was broken by the results of this round itself, with Millard's head-to-head win earning him silver and placing Frändfors in third for the bronze.

 Bouts

	

 Points

References

Wrestling at the 1936 Summer Olympics